Beitar Jerusalem Football Club, commonly known as Beitar Jerusalem or simply as Beitar, is an Israeli football club based in the city of Jerusalem, that plays in the Israeli Premier League, the top tier in Israeli football. The club has traditionally worn kit colours of yellow and black. The team has played its home matches in Teddy Stadium. The stadium is the largest stadium in Israel with a capacity of 31,733.

The club is one of the most popular in Israel and is among the Israeli clubs with the highest number of fans in the country.  The club was founded in 1936 by Shmuel Kirschstein and David Horn, who chaired the Betar branch in Jerusalem. Several team members were also part of the outlawed Irgun and Lehi militias closely associated with the right-wing Revisionist Zionism movement.  Beitar's fans have become a highly controversial political symbol in Israeli football culture, unofficially aligned with the Revisionist Zionist movement and to the right-wing Likud party. The club, whose fanbase is notorious for its anti-Arab racism and anti-Muslim religious bigotry, remains the only one in the Israel Premier League to have never signed an Arab player, although the club signed four non-Arab Muslim players in the past.

Domestically, Beitar has won the Israeli Premier League on 6 occasions, in 1986–87, 1992–93, 1996–97, 1997–98 and 2006–07, 2007–08, 7 Israeli Cup titles, in 1975–76, 1978–79, 1984–85, 1985–86, 1988–89, 2007–08, and 2008–09, and 2 Israeli Supercups in 1976 and 1986 respectively.

History

British Mandate 
Beitar Jerusalem was founded in 1936 by Shmuel Kirschstein and David Horn as a youth team. The first games were held against Armenian and Arab teams in Jerusalem, though Hapoel Jerusalem boycotted for political reasons. 
In 1942, a match was held at Tel Aviv's Maccabiah Stadium between Beitar and the Islamic Sports Club of Haifa. Beitar won 5–1. At the end of 1943 and early 1944, Beitar played several games against the club from Katamon, Al-Dajani, the city's leading Arab team.

Jerusalem Cup Games of 1944
15 April 1944: Beitar Jerusalem 1–1 Plebis
22 April 1944: Beitar Jerusalem 2–2 Plebis
13 May 1944: Beitar Jerusalem 3–2 Plebis
20 May 1944: Beitar Jerusalem 1–3 Allwain

Later, Beitar Jerusalem qualified for the final, which was to be held against the team of the "Paymasters" of the British mandate. The fans of rival Hapoel Jerusalem  disrupted the game and the "Jerusalem Cup remained in the hands of the politicians in Tel Aviv."

On 19 October 1944, several club players were among 251 persons who were deported to Eritrea, Kenya and Sudan by the British Mandate authorities. Among the deportees were David Horn and Rabinovich and some members of Beitar Jerusalem's "First team of 1936." A Beitar Jerusalem team was set up in Gilgil where many deportees played in city-of-origin based teams. A plan was made to dig a tunnel from the centre of a football pitch in the detention camp in Kenya. Two of the deportees were murdered by Sudanese guards for an alleged "escaping attempt". Six succeeded in reaching Europe. All living deportees reached Israel in July 1948.

When a joint team of Beitar Jerusalem and Beitar Tel Aviv visited Lebanon and Syria, they played against Homenetmen, an Armenian team, which ended in 0–0, and the French Army team, in which Beitar lost 2–5. Both games were held in Beirut. Another game, planned in Aleppo, was cancelled because of a diplomatic incident as Arab delegates in the hotel protested seeing an "Eretz Yisrael" flag, now the Israeli flag, in an Arab country. The British ambassador intervened, suggesting that the Union Jack be raised instead of the "Eretz Yisrael" flag, but the head of delegation Hayyim Levin opposed. Due to the impasse, the game was canceled. Simon Alfasi, Shimon Stern, Yisrael Yehezqel and goalkeeper Yosef Meyuhas were the Beitar Jerusalem players in the trip.

In 1946, Beitar Jerusalem qualified to the 2nd round of the Cup Games against Maccabi Tel Aviv. The scores were a 3–3 and a loss 3–2 in game 2. Simon Alfasi scored all five goals for the club, three in the first and two in the second.

On 8 August 1947, all Beitar clubs were banned by the British mandate authorities. The club name was changed to "Nordiah Jerusalem", before a local league was set up in Jerusalem district in November 1947. On 15 November 1947, Beitar as "Nordiah Jerusalem" won the first derby, 3–1 over Hapoel Jerusalem, and on 29 November 1947, a second win was achieved, 8–1 over Degel Zion when one player Simon Alfasi scored six goals in a game, the record for any Beitar Jerusalem's player that stands until today. The club led the league on 29 November 1947, on the same evening when UN GA Resolution 181 was proclaimed, and on 30 November 1947 the games were stopped abruptly: on that day the 1948 Arab–Israeli War broke out. During the war, Beitar Jerusalem player Asher Benjamin was killed by the British when he entered to a British camp in Jerusalem.

State of Israel
After independence in 1948, Beitar, again by its original name, played since 1949–50 season in a "Special League" of "Jerusalem's district", ending in 5th place while achieving a win of 8–0 over Hapoel Ramla on 17 December 1949, the highest league win of Beitar Jerusalem in any league the club played. In 1951–52 season, the club integrated into Liga Bet southern part, then the second tier. In 1953–54 the club won the southern division of Liga Bet, and were promoted to the top league, which had just been renamed Liga Leumit. In their first season in the top flight they finished 11th out of 14, and were forced to participate in promotion/relegation play-offs. Although they were the highest-placed club to take part in the play-offs, they finished at the bottom of the group, Beitar were relegated back to the second league, now renamed Liga Alef.

In 1957–58 they won Liga Alef, but were not promoted, as there was no promotion or relegation that year.

They won Liga Alef again in 1966–68 (a two-year season) and were promoted back to Liga Leumit. That was the best league season ever for Beitar Jerusalem, although it was winning the 2nd division "only". 104 points out of possible 120, for a season of 60 matches when two points were given for winning a match. The club had 32 match undefeated streak with a sequence of 19 wins starting with the 42nd match to the 60th match inclusive, the record of Beitar Jerusalem in any league, scoring 161 league goals. 225,000 spectators saw the club matches in that season. The prize that the club management gave to the players was a trip to the United States of America.

After finishing thirteenth in 1968–69, Beitar finished fifth in 1969–70, their best performance to date.

1970s
In the 1971–72 Liga they finished as runners-up to Maccabi Tel Aviv. In 1974, during a match against Hapoel Petah Tikva, Beitar fans invaded the pitch and attacked Petah Tikva players and fans. This caused the first of several "radius" penalties, in which the club was forced to play matches in other cities behind closed doors. Beitar were also due to be relegated, but were saved by the intervention of Knesset members Ehud Olmert and Yossi Sarid, who forced the suspension of the relegation threat and called for an investigation of Israel Football Association corruption. In 1974–75 the club reached the State Cup final for the first time, but lost 3–1 to Hapoel Kfar Saba. In the same season they finished second bottom of the league, and were due to be relegated to Liga Alef. However, an IFA decision to expand the league from 16 to 18 clubs saw them reprieved.

The next season they finished runners-up in the league to Hapoel Be'er Sheva and reached the State Cup final again, this time beating Maccabi Tel Aviv 2–1 to claim their first piece of major silverware, on 16 June 1976, 55,000 or 60,000 spectators saw the game in an overcrowded Ramat Gan Stadium. Danny Noyman and Uri Malmilian scored for Beitar Jerusalem. On 11 September 1976, the club won the Israeli Super Cup for the first time after beating Hapoel Be'er Sheva 3–2. Uri Malmilian scored two goals and David Yishai scored another goal for Beitar Jerusalem.

The club finished as runners-up in 1977–78.

In 1978–79, the club ended as runners-up: they also reached the cup final, winning 2–1 against Maccabi Tel Aviv, on 6 June 1979. Danny Noyman and Yossi Avrahami scored for Beitar Jerusalem, to win the State Cup for the 2nd time.

Despite the run of success towards the end of the 1970s, the club was dependent mainly on Uri Malmilian's ability. Early in the season he suffered an awful injury, crippling him with the need of three operations until 1981, and missing most of the games until the summer of 1981. Beitar finished bottom of the division in 1979–80, and were relegated to Liga Artzit. However, they made an immediate return to the top division after finishing as runners-up to Beitar Tel Aviv in their first season back in the second tier.

1980s
The 1981–82 started with a sports disaster for the club. On 12 September 1981, referee Avraham Klein gave a win to Maccabi Tel Aviv in a series of a wrong decisions: cancelling a goal of Beitar Jerusalem's player Yaron Adiv when he and Beitar's players celebrated the goal, then allowing seconds after Maccabi player Moti Ivanir to score a goal from an offside position. A crowd of 8,000 Beitar Jerusalem's fans went crazy. The Israeli Football Association quickly decided to punish Beitar Jerusalem and discussed the so-called "football game" for six weeks before stating to leave the outcome as 2–1 win to Maccabi Tel Aviv, and filing a reprimand about Avraham Klein. Also the next game of Beitar Jerusalem is remembered: on 19 September 1981, a player of Hapoel Be'er Sheva, Shalom Avitan hit his teammate Eli Vaitzman on his face, and Hapoel Be'er Sheva coach entered the pitch and took Shalom Avitan by his hand out of the pitch, preventing a red card by the referee. Beitar Jerusalem won 2–0. Later, with Eli Ohana in his first season, Beitar Jerusalem improved its standing, ending the season in 6th place, above Maccabi Tel Aviv, who, to the delights of Beitar fans, ended that season in 8th place.

The season of 1982–83 is remembered as the "Crazy Season". A bad start of two draws and two losses caused the firing of the coach Eliahu Ofer without stopping his salary payments, and he said "They will ask me to come back". After changing of seven Management members and five coaches, Eliahu Ofer was asked to come back and he came back to be a coach in mid-season, the club was in 16th and last place for two weeks but recovered: from the 18th game to 29th game inclusive, 12 no-lose-sequence of games, Beitar ended the season in the 8th place. This is a place to explain that traditionally as a Beitar movement branch, the club was managed by Heruth and later Likud parties members. Party members were appointed by party apparatus to the party representative football club managers to give them managing training before venturing out into the political arena. This arrangement lasted until 1999. Some of the managers are ever remembered for good reasons who held Beitar well, such as Reuven Rivlin and his Brother Eliezer Rivlin, but Yossi Zharzhervski left the club after his well remembered brawl with Uri Malmilian when Zharzhevski told Malmilian in the midst of the troubles of 1982–83 season: "I will burn your legs". As a fan said, "Within 3 days Zharzhevski will not be in Beitar", and the fan was proved right. Uri Malmilian was referred by Beitar fans as a saint and was given full support. On the third day Zharzhevski resigned.

In 1983–84 Beitar went into the penultimate game of the season needing a win or draw to win the title. However, they lost 1–3 to Hapoel Tel Aviv, allowing Maccabi Haifa to win the league, despite Beitar winning the last game 3–2 against Shimshon Tel Aviv, Maccabi Haifa won 1–0 over Maccabi Ramat Amidar and became champions.

In 1984–85 Beitar finished again as runner-up, and won the State Cup for the third time, winning 1–0 over Maccabi Haifa on 4 June 1985. Eli Ohana scored, after which coach David Shveizer left.

In 1985–86, in the summer of 1985, Dror Kashtan took over as manager. Almost immediately the club won the  Lilian Cup on 10 September 1985 for the first and only time, after winning all four of its games by combined scores of 14–2. Asher Sason scored six goals, at least one goal in each game. Beitar Jerusalem finished the league in the 4th place. They retained the cup in 1985–86, beating Shimshon Tel Aviv 2–1, on 27 May 1986. This was the 4th time that the club won the State Cup. Eli Ohana and Uri Malmilian scored for Beitar Jerusalem.

On 16 September 1986, Beitar Jerusalem won the Israeli Super Cup for the 2nd time, after winning 2–1 over Hapoel Tel Aviv. Eli Ohana and Uri Malmilian Scored for Beitar Jerusalem.

Despite having to play all home matches at Bloomfield Stadium in Tel Aviv, in 1986–87 Beitar claimed their first championship on 2 May 1987, winning the league by a 15-point margin. Both Uri Malmilian and Eli Ohana scored 15 league goals Each. Sammy Malkah scored 13 league goals to make his best season of his career, Gary Van Der Mullen became the ace card and secured eight league points by scoring five league goals in about 17 games, most of them as a substitute. On 3 May 1987 a reporter of Maariv wrote: "I saw the disappointment-full crowds frenzied out of happiness, it is a thing that cannot be described in words." Dror Kashtan's "Coronation Speech" lasted only 36 seconds.

Kashtan left the club to manage Maccabi Haifa. Eliahu Ofer, after the absence of a few seasons, again became the coach. In 1987–88 Beitar Jerusalem ended in 9th place, and at the end of the league the club won the Israeli Mini Football championship for the first time on 24 May 1988 after beating Bnei Yehuda 5–3. That was the first and the last time ever that a nationwide mini football tournament was held in Israel; 24 teams took part. The tournament was held in Malha Stadium in a hall regularly used for Basketball games. Uri Malmilian acted as the owner of the place and was the tournament star. Eliahu Ofer finally won a title with Beitar Jerusalem.

Kashtan returned in 1988. In 1988–89 they won the State Cup again. Uri Malmilian scored seven goals on his way to winning the trophy. The club beat Maccabi Haifa 4–3 on penalties after a 3–3 draw on 14 June 1989. Uri Malmilian scored one goal, and Avi Cohen of Jerusalem scored two goals in the game and one goal in the penalties shootout, both in their last game before leaving Beitar Jerusalem. Moshe Ben Harush, Hannan Azulay and Ya'akov Schwartz were the other scorers of the penalties shootout, Beitar Jerusalem players did not miss. Two of Maccabi Haifa players missed. That was the 5th winning of the club in the State Cup Kashtan left the club again during 1989.

The 1989–90 was a survival struggle, it became a success by winning the last league game, 3–2 over Maccabi Netanya F.C. Each of three scorers scored their first and only goal in the whole season. Guram Adzhoyev, that Israeli media told that he is a Tadjik player who came from Russia, got sympathy among fans for his games despite scoring only one goal. That goal secured a good end to that season. The Bulgarian Atanas Pashev was the season star. Four league goals made him the top scorer of the club, one-fifth of the 20 league goals that Beitar Jerusalem players scored during that season, but he was attributed that his goals literally saved the club from being relegated.

1990s
In 1990–91 they finished second bottom of Liga Leumit, and were relegated to Liga Artzit. Under Lufa Kadosh (23 April 1940 – 29 April 2014) the club made an immediate return to the top division. Eli Ohana returned from Europe as ever since regarded as a man who came to save his club. He scored 17 league goals in that season. The club won 1st place in a margin of nine league goals over Hapoel Haifa, both had 60 league points, and both were promoted.

Kashtan returned to the club, winning on 1 May 1993, the 2nd time championship in their first season back in Liga Leumit, the club won 22 league games out of 33 setting a winning record in the 1st division and 71 points, also a record during one 1st division league season for Beitar Jerusalem. Eli Ohana and Ronen Harazi where the championship stars. On 16 March 1993, in the State Cup games, the club set its all-time record in any tournament with a 9–0 win over Beitar Ramla.

The 1993–94 season ended when the score of the club was 75–66 (+9) but yielded almost nothing positive. Kashtan departed for a fourth time.

The coach Amazia Levkovitch came and the season of 1994–95 started bad, he was fired after four games, replaced by Yossi Mizrahi, the club started in the 16th and last place, reached to 1st place and ended in 8th place, meanwhile achieving a win of 8–1 over Maccabi Herzliya on 22 October 1994, the highest win ever of Beitar Jerusalem in the first league games.

In Liga Leumit 1995–96 with the appointment of Eli Cohen, the club improved to finish in 3rd place.

The club won the championship title for the 3rd time in 1996–97 on 17 May 1997. On its way the club gained eight straight wins and after that within the season nine wins in a row. This is a record in Beitar Jerusalem games in the 1st league games. Eli Ohana, Ronen Harazi and Itzik Zohar were the championship stars. As the season ended, Eli Cohen said: "Two years in Beitar are equal to five years elsewhere." His contract ended and he left.

In 1997–98, Beitar Jerusalem won the Toto Cup for the 1st time on 23 December 1997 by winning 3–1 over Maccabi Tel Aviv and later in that season won the 4th championship on 9 May 1998, by which time Kashtan had returned to the club again.

Despite Itzik Zohar leaving and Eli Ohana suffering an injury in the seventh game without playing until the end, Istvan Pisont led the club to win an achievement only preceded by Maccabi Haifa in 1994.

In 1998–99 Beitar reached the cup final, but lost 3–1 on penalties to Hapoel Tel Aviv after a 1–1 draw.

Director Moshe Dadash could not carry the club alone. The Involvement of Likud party diminished to that of Ehud Olmert alone. On 6 October 1999 Beitar was sold for the first time to Yaakov Ben Gur. Kashtan was replaced by former player Eli Ohana, under whom the club reached the cup final again the following season, where they lost on penalties to Hapoel Tel Aviv again. Yaakov Ben Gur left over a brawl with Eli Ohana and the team was sold to Gad Zeevi.

2000s
At the end of the 1990s the club was in severe financial difficulties; chairman Moshe Dadash had sold the club's training grounds and pocketed the money. Gad Zeevi brought the money to buy ten new players in almost unlimited prices and salaries. At the end of the 1999–00 season, Ohana was fired and replaced by Eli Guttman. Guttman started the Ligat Ha'Al 2000–01 well, going the first 18 games without a loss, and won also the Shalom Cup (Roma) – Peace Cup. In Rome on 10 September 2000 the club beat Alwaqass from Jordan 7–0 in a game which lasted 45 minutes, Scoreres : Yaniv Abarjil 3, Alon Mizrahi 2, Beni Hadad 1, AlJaabir (OG) 1. Later in the same evening Beitar won 1–0 over Roma, scorer : Yaniv Abarjil. In another 45 minutes game, and won its first and only title out of Israel. Days later Beitar lost 1–3 to PAOK in UEFA Cup tournament in Greece. The next game with PAOK ended in 3–3 draw. Moshe Dadash was forced to leave by Israel Football Association over his juristic problems exposed in 2001 concerning the training pitch in Bayit Vegan. The real trouble was exposed by an Israeli court in 2005. Later the season ended in a fiasco, both on the pitch and financially, Guttman became sick and left after 22 league games, and Nissim Bakhar the winner of two titles in 1976 returned, and brought quiet to the team until the season ended. In the later years Eli Guttman and players were accused by fans and media in cheating Gad Zeevi and capitalizing over his expense, concerning the real prices and salaries of some players, especially Branko Savić and Milan Stoyanoski. Gad Zeevi got into troubles with Israeli police over Bezeq shares, and found Beitar Jerusalem "Financially Unworthy" and left Beitar, applying to a court to declare Beitar's bankruptcy.

After the club's bankruptcy was declared by a court, 'Ami Fulman was appointed as an interim director by the court until club debts could be settled. 'Ami Fulman and his assistant got a salary of 1 million NIS together and the club was given a budget of 5 million NIS. The previous season players were convinced to get only 25% of their contracted salaries, those agreeing joining the Creditors Arrangement. The club started to search for players and new owner(s) and fans took active part in it, filling the courtroom in every discussion about the club, and some opened a bank account for donations. Its number was known to few only 54,000 NIS were collected. Beitar Jerusalem was not allowed to play the first three games; the games were postponed instead of forfeited by Beitar. The club started to play only from the 4th game onward, losing the 4th, 5th, 6th games, playing to a draw in the next three games and winning for the 1st time vs. Hapoel Rishon LeZion. Meanwhile, new buyers were approved by the court: Meir Panijel and brothers Meir Levi and Shaul Levi, aided by Sasson Shem Tov. The fans felt that they had done their best to help their team. Until the 29th league game, inclusive, out of 33, Beitar was in 12th and last place, with only five wins and ten draws, 25 points. The 30th game was won, and also the 31st game was won. The 32nd game was a draw 3–3 against Maccabi Kiryat Gat F.C. a rival in the bottom of the league. Beitar Jerusalem promoted jumped to 10th place. The last game was a draw 1–1 vs. the new champion Maccabi Haifa. Beitar ended the season with 7 league wins, 12 draws, 14 losses, 33 points, 39 goals for, 49 goals against, and kept the 10th place and avoided relegation. Manor Hassan scored 11 league goals in his only season as a club player. Beitar scored 15 goals in 3 State Cup games, including an away win 7–2 over F.C. Ashdod but lost 0–1 to Maccabi Haifa in the semi-final, on 7 May 2002.

The club ended the season of 2002–03 in the 9th place, and was certificated by Israel Football Association as the Honest Team of the Season, in the merit of 0 red cards and 71 yellow cards of club players, the least numbers in the whole of the Israeli leagues. The prize was a DVD recorder given to the club with the certificate about the achievement.

The news for the club ahead of 2003–2004 season, came from Maccabi Tel Aviv, the champion of 2002–03 season. On 13 August 2003, three senior club members declared in a press conference: Avi Nimni and Tal Banin were being ousted from the club, accused of dividing the team ("Making Camps of separate players"). Meir Panijel saw the opportunity to take Avi Nimni; the problem was his large contract. Meir Panijel offered 3 Million NIS. After months of negotiations, en elaborate deal was made. Nimni got 4,200,000 NIS for 2 seasons, part of it paid by Maccabi Tel Aviv. Nimni joined with Beitar Jerusalem in mid season, scoring eight league goals as Beitar ended the season in 9th place.

A Futsal team of Beitar Jerusalem led by former football goalkeeper Shlomi Maman won the 2004 championship. although a planned playoff never held, because of a financial crisis of the league. Beitar jerusalem was in 1st place then, and any mention of it was vanished from the Israeli media at once. Many years later it became clear the Beitar Jerusalem was declared as a champion.

Avi Nimni continued to play with the club during 2004–05 season, adding 12 more league goals, his charisma helping the team to 4th place. By the end of the season Avi Nimni aggregate score was 20 league goals in 50 league games.

During the summer of 2005 it was proven that Meir Panijel had financial problems. The only worthy thing that remained out of his ownership of the club was the value of the training court in Bayit Vegan. After spending 60 million NIS in about four years he looked for his way out. The contract of Avi Nimni was a huge burden. Nimni was returned to Maccabi Tel Aviv by its fans that threw away all three persons that expelled him two years earlier. Panijel got relief for Beitar Jerusalem finances, and 1 year short of Nimni's contract termination with the club, both separated in good ways. The help to Beitar was unexpected after the 2005–2006 season started. On 18 August 2005, the club was bought by Russian-born billionaire Arcadi Gaydamak for 35,500,000 NIS without buying the training facility in Bayit Vegan. Meir Panijel continues to lease the training facility to the club for a yearly fee. Arcadi Gaydamak angered some Beitar fans when he donated $400,000 to Bnei Sakhnin in a diplomatic gesture. However, under Gaydamak, the club soon established itself as having the largest budget in Israeli football. Several new players were signed such as Jérôme Leroy, Fabrice Fernandes, David Aganzo and the club eventually signed manager Luis Fernández. Beitar finished 3rd in the league and qualified for the UEFA Cup in 2005–06.

Osvaldo Ardiles was appointed manager at the start of the 2006–07 season, but was sacked after disappointing results in the UEFA Cup. His replacement, Yossi Mizrahi, led the club to its 5th championship. On 7 May 2007, three games before the season's end, the club received the title offer via a TV news broadcast; Maccabi Tel Aviv had been punished by with the removal of two league points due to a financial fraud involving the contracts of two of its players. This increased the margin of Beitar Jerusalem from 8 to 10 points with three games, worth nine points together, left to play. Afterwards there was a fan celebration ahead of the evening of game on 6 May 2007, a win against Hapoel Petah Tikva 2–0, because of a rumor that the championship was secured, which was false then. On 8 May 2007, the club player Milovan Mirošević told the press: "It is weird to win the championship without a game." Beitar Jerusalem did the best to win its next game over Hapoel Tel Aviv and won 2–1, to prove to be entitled for the championship on the pitch.

In the summer of 2007, Itzhak Shum came to be the club manager. In 2007–08 the club won its first championship and State Cup. Double, winning the championship title on 17 May 2008 by nine points and beating Hapoel Tel Aviv 5–4 on penalties in the cup final after a 0–0 draw, on 13 May 2008 for winning the State cup for the sixth time.

The following season, 2008–09 season started when Itzhak Shum as club manager, but bad start to the league and disqualification to UEFA Champions League, Shum was sacked without stopping his wages payments. Reuven Atar came to be the coach. In the last third of the season, Beitar went on a roll, eventually winning the State Cup for the 7th time, beating Maccabi Haifa 2–1 in the final on 26 May 2009. This was despite finishing the game with 10 players vs. 11; Cristian Alvarez and Aviram Baruchyan scored for the club.

In July 2009, Guma Aguiar invested over US$4 million and it was widely expected that he would take over ownership of the club, and indeed claimed to be so in December 2009. This was denied by the Israel Football Association, stating that Gaydamak remains the owner due to his ongoing legal issues complicating the sale of the club. Itzhak Shum returned to work as he was still under contract. On 26 January 2010, Beitar Jerusalem won the Toto Cup for the second time, beating  Hapoel Ra'anana 1–0 on the strength of an Idan Vered goal. The trophy was given along with 1,300,000 NIS. At the beginning of the tournament Fans told Toto Tamuz: "Please win the cup called after your name" and he became the tournament star when he scored five goals out of the club total 15 goals. The club won seven games, one of them by a technical 3–0, one draw and one loss. Itzhak Shum told the media that he fulfilled his mission: Winning all three titles with Beitar Jerusalem, namely Championship, State Cup and Toto Cup, but he was unfortunate: Many fans claimed his football is "boring" and "sickening" and he had hard times from crowds without honour. He was fired before the season ended with the club ending the league in the 5th place. The club ended the season in financial profit, made by the Toto Cup money.

2010s
Uri Malmilian started the 2010–11 season as a manager. In Toto Cup games the team started successfully. It passed the group stage without losing, ending in 1st place while setting its record score of any time in this tournament. On 9 November 2010 the club won 8–0 vs. F.C. Ashdod, qualified to the quarter-final. In the league games the club had hard times. Uri Malmilian asked to resign, but remained as a manager until after the 18th game. Beitar had only 19 points when he resigned, replaced by Ronny Levy. Beitar Jerusalem lost the Toto cup quarter-final to Maccabi Petah Tikva in penalties shootout. The club ended in 11th place.

In July 2011, Beitar Jerusalem announced that a deal was made between club owner Arcadi Gaydamak and American businessmen Dan Adler and Adam Levine who were to take over the club. However, the deal fell through when Adler and Levin heard about the club debts. Both Adler and Levine were referred by Beitar fans as "Two clowns who came to make an advertising trip on the expense of Beitar Jerusalem."

During June 2011, David Amsalem was appointed as a coach, but a few days before the league start in August he suddenly resigned a day after the team won 1–0 in a Toto Cup game. Amsalem explained that the team was not prepared for the season, and without new players he could not be responsible to the future. Yuval Naim replaced him. An unsuccessful start caused an end to his job when the club was close to the league's bottom. Eli Cohen, the winner of 1997 championship, became club manager. He won the title "Coach of the season" because of a sequence of 8 Beitar Jerusalem's league wins during his period. Beitar finished the season in 9th place.

On 17 June 2012, Gaydamak announced his decision to give up the ownership of Beitar Jerusalem, via a letter to the media, in which he specified the titles won by the club in his period, and the total sum of money that he invested in the club, by then: 378,886,000 NIS.

On 20 June 2013, the team was bought by Eli Tabib. The deal was confirmed on 2 July 2013. Eli Tabib took the responsibility to pay Beitar Jerusalem FC debts, totaling 12.5 Million NIS. The media reported that he paid most of them during August 2013.

After 6 years in office, Tabib removed Itzik Korenfein from the position of Club chairman.

Before the beginning of 2013/14 season, Eli Cohen II was appointed as Head Coach until December 2013. Ronny Levy replaced Cohen, but the club failed to improve in its achievements.

In April 2014, Menachem Koretski become the new coach until January 2015. Koretski was replaced by Guy Levy who led the club into the fourth place in the Championship table standings. For the first time since 2007, Beitar returned to European tournaments to compete in the European League. In June 2015 Slobodan Drapić became the new coach.

During the Europa League second qualifying round first leg at Sporting Charleroi, the game between Beitar and FC Charleroi was delayed for three minutes due to the unruly behavior of some Israeli supporters. The club suffered a heavy loss in Charleroi (5–1) and the owner Eli Tabib announced he would leave the club.

At the end of 2015–16 season, Beitar finished in the 3rd place in IPL and qualified for the Europa League first qualifying round. Slobodan Drapić left the club due to his contract ended and Ran Ben Shimon was appointed as the new manager. Beitar signed new players as: Idan Vered, Marcel Heister and Erik Sabo.

At the end of 2017–18 season, Beitar finished in the 3rd place in IPL and reach the Israeli cup final, but lost the title to Hapoel Haifa. Beitar Jerusalem scored at least one goal in each and every one of 36 league games in 2017–18 season, continuing scoring since the last 6 league games in 2016–17 season since 22 April 2017 making a record of 42 consecutive league games that Beitar Jerusalem scored, before adding the 1st league game in the next season, by scoring in it, making a record of 43 consecutive league games that Beitar Jerusalem scored, the historical record for the Israeli football ever. Beitar scored 75 league goals in 2017–18 season, even its record score in 1993–94 season.

On 13 May 2018, the club announced that it was changing its official name to Beitar Trump Jerusalem Football Club, saying that U.S. President Donald J. Trump had "displayed courage, vision and true love for the people of Israel and their capital."

On Monday, 13 August 2018, Beitar Jerusalem was sold to Moshe Hogeg, a high-tech entrepreneur, for 26.5 million NIS, which was 18 million NIS to Eli Tabib and 8.5 million NIS for debts payments and avoiding lawsuits. During that week Israeli defender Tal Ben Haim joined with the club. After buying the team, Hogeg said that he hoped to put it on a "new path" and that religion would no longer be a factor in the club's personnel decisions.

2020s
On 7 December 2020, Sheikh Hamad bin Khalifa Al Nahyan, a member of Abu Dhabi's ruling family, announced plans to acquire a 50 percent stake in the club. The deal was brokered by Jewish-Emirati businessman Naum Koen, chairman of the NY Koen Group. Al Nahyan's son, Mohamed bin Hamad bin Khalifa, was to sit on the team's board of directors. As part of the deal, Sheikh Khalifa al-Nahyan was to invest roughly $92 million into the club over the next ten years and his son would join the club's board of directors. Co-owner Moshe Hogeg said the new arrangement was an attempt to recast the club's image. "Our message is that we are all equal. We want to show to young kids that we are all equal and that we can work and do beautiful things together." However, the deal did not proceed, and collapsed in 2022 following claims of financial misconduct and Hogeg being accused of sex crimes.

2020-2021
Beitar Ended the league games in the 10th place. Moshe Hogeg had a "war in court" against 4 members of La Familia which made his life hard : Cursed his daughter and Told him : "We know in which school your son learns".

2021-2022
During September 2021 Moshe Hogeg  decided to sell Beitar Jerusalem after investing 120 million NIS, a thing that he repeated to mention. In November 2021 he announced that he quits putting money in beitar jerusalem as of January 2022, and appointed lawyer Yitzhaq Younger as the man in charge as a trustee. Moshe Hogeg was arrested and later released by Israeli Police during that season. Economic troubles started, along with football hardships that where harming Beitar Jerusalem from the start of that season. The team management was searching for money to pay salaries. Some players were released in mid season. All other players and workers, had to agree that their salaries will be reduced by 30% but an agreement was made that the 30% are a "loan" from the players to the club. An improved playoff in the end of the season with no losses, gained the 10th place, on the last game on May 14, 2022. After that, the troubles of Beitar Jerusalem where intensified. Eli Ohana left his chairman role on May 31, on the end of his contract, maybe because of 2 reasons : unsuccessful relationships with Moshe Hogeg during that 
season, and knowing that there was no money for continuing his job. Israeli police regarded every Moshe Hogeg's properties as places of "concealing money", including Beitar Jerusalem. During July 2022, Israeli Police got earlier a permission by a court, to confiscate all Moshe Hogeg properties. Beitar Jerusalem became a hostage by law. Until August 10, there was a constant threat to relegate Beitar Jerusalem to "A league" because of debts of 42 Million NIS, by a regulation that a club that can not pay it's contracts should not play in a professional league. Israeli Police demanded money from Moshe hogeg, and the intended buyer, Baraq Avramov, withdrew from negotiations by 9 August by Noon. On that afternoon by 18:00 Moshe Hogeg addressed the media urging Baraq Avramov to save Beitar Jerusalem, blaming all about no help, and asking "Is Beitar Jerusalem a property of  the Police ?". in 9 August, 23:44 A Facebook page of Betar fans reported : Baraq Avramov is back in negotiations. A Likud Knesset member, Nir Barkat, A former Jerusalem's Mayor, found a donator to Beitar Jerusalem which donated 2 Million NIS. The threat of relegation was removed on August 10, 2022, when in elaborate deal was made between Moshe Hogeg and Baraq Avramov, and Beitar Jerusalem was sold to Baraq Avramov, which was forced to pay 5 Million NIS to Israeli Police, also in order to prevent money from Moshe Hogeg. This happened in August 10, After all was approved, on August 11, 2022, about 16:00 PM, Beitar Jerusalem was allowed to start 2022–2023 season in the IPL.

2022-2023
After negotiations, On August 17, 2022 Beitar Jerusalem sold it's NFT rights for 6 years to Chroma-Way for 700000 Euros.

Crest and colours

Crest

The Menorah is the emblem of Israel and the logo of the early Revisionist Zionist movement Betar.

Shirt sponsors and manufacturers

Rivalries

Rivalry with Hapoel Jerusalem

Rivalry with Hapoel Tel Aviv
Another rivalry with Hapoel Tel Aviv which is a political rivalry, as Hapoel Tel Aviv supporters tend to be socialist, a stark contrast to the more right wing Beitar supporters.

Rivalry with Bnei Sakhnin 
The rivalry with Bnei Sakhnin is too, a political rivalry as well as an ethnic and racial rivalry as Bnei Sakhnin are the most successful predominantly Arab club while Beitar Jerusalem remains the only major club to have never signed a Muslim Arab player in Israel.

Grounds

Stadiums

Former Stadiums

Beitar held its first games as a professional football team in the "Dajani field", which was located in the old Katamon neighborhood. After the War of Independence and the establishment of the State of Israel, the team's home was officially moved to the YMCA Stadium, which has since become the team's regular home ground, until 1991, when the team moved to Teddy Stadium.

Teddy Stadium

In 1991, Beitar has moved to the Teddy Stadium, named after longtime Jerusalem mayor Teddy Kollek. Initially the stadium was two-sided and held 12,000 spectators. This was increased to 21,600 when a third side was completed in 1997. The fourth side of the stadium was completed in the summer of 2013 in anticipation of the UEFA under 21 championship hosted by Israel, increasing the capacity of the stadium to 31,733 seats.

The ground has been dubbed Gehinom (lit. Hell) by club supporters, for the hostile atmosphere it presents to visiting teams and their fans.

Training Ground
All of the departments of Beitar Jerusalem train in the training complex at Beit Vagan. The complex includes locker rooms for the alumni group and the youth department, gyms, physiotherapy rooms, dining room, cloakrooms and treatment rooms. The complex contains three training fields, two of them with synthetic grass. Each of the fields has two Tribunes on both sides, and all contain a total of about 750 seats.

The club's offices have been in the complex since 2009, and there is a fan shop inside the complex that sells cheerleading and merchandise products for the group's fans.

Supporters and politics

The most vocal supporters of Beitar Jerusalem make up the controversial nationalist La Familia group. These fans are well known for their opposition to integrating Arabs into the club and they are proud of the fact that Beitar Jerusalem is the only team in the IPL that has never had an Arab player, although it has had several non-Arab players of the Islamic faith. Fans in and out of the stadium's stands chant anti-Arab and racist slogans — as "Death to Arabs". The club has also been penalized many times for the behavior of its fans.

Although Beitar Jerusalem has yet to have an Arab player, team leaders say that they would welcome an Arab player when the right conditions make it possible.

Guram Adzhoyev, a Tajik, was the first Muslim to ever play for Beitar Jerusalem. During the hardship 1989–90 season, his religion went unnoticed by most fans. Adzhoyev was well liked by Beitar fans due to his all-out efforts during 13 games of the season's second half. Adzhoyev's single goal in the last game, a 3–2 Beitar win over Maccabi Netanya, helped the club secure a berth the following season in Liga Leumit, the top league in Israel at the time.

Viktor Paço, an Albanian player, was a star for Beitar Jerusalem. He scored 21 league goals in 67 games and at least 2 State Cup goals during 2 non-consecutive seasons: 1999–00 and 2001–02. In an interview to the Jerusalem newspaper "Kol Ha'Ir", he stated that he is a Muslim, a fact that was later mentioned in the Israeli media.

Nigerian player Ndala Ibrahim, a Muslim, was on the team briefly in 2005 on loan from Maccabi Tel Aviv, played 4 games, supported by coach Eli Ohana, but left after being mobbed by Beitar fans. He returned to Maccabi Tel Aviv and soon returned to Nigeria.

In 2013, the club signed two Chechen Muslim players, Zaur Sadayev and Dzhabrail Kadiyev. When fans protested, Israeli Deputy Prime Minister Moshe Yaalon condemned the protest as shocking and racist, stating "I was shocked by the racism displayed in the Beitar Jerusalem stands yesterday against having Muslim or Arab players on the team". Fans of the club reportedly displayed a banner bearing the words "Beitar – forever pure" and chanted anti-Arab slogans at a match the day the players were signed, leading to four arrests. On 8 February 2013, 2 fans, Matan Navon and Evyatar Yosef, set fire to the club's administrative offices, apparently in response to the signing of Sadayev and Kadiyev. Prime Minister Benjamin Netanyahu, who is a Beitar supporter (along with many other senior Likud politicians), condemned the arson as "shameful" and "racist". On 3 March, Sadayev scored his first goal for Beitar during a league game against Maccabi Netanya, prompting hundreds of the team's fans to leave the stadium.

In 2019, Beitar fans association La Familia demanded that Ali Mohamed, a Christian from Niger who had signed for the club, change his name as Mohamed sounded "too Muslim", leading the club's owner Moshe Hogeg to threaten to sue the fans.

Honours

League

Cup competitions

Mini Football / Futsal

Beitar Jerusalem in Europe
Beitar Jerusalem participated in Intertoto games in Summer of 1976 : 2 wins, 2 draws, 2 losses. The Winner of the preliminary group stage was BSC Young Boys, and also in 1984, 1985, 1987, 1988, 1993, 1995, 2005. Beitar's first competitive European match which was not a part of Intertoto games, was a 1–1 draw with FC Zimbru Chişinău in the 1993-94 UEFA Champions League. The team has participated in the UEFA Champions League five times, never advancing farther than the second qualifying round.

UEFA Team Ranking

 Bold row separators indicate change of ranking system.
 Italic font indicate ongoing season.

Results

Records

Club own records
Seasons in the Israeli Premier League: 53 (Including 2021–2022)
Lowest season position: 10 in the second league (League A)
Record win: 9:0 (against Beitar Ramla F.C. 1992–93, State Cup)
Record win in any league: 8:0 (against Hapoel Ramla F.C. 1949–50, Jerusalem District League)
Record win in the first league: 8:1 (against Maccabi Herzliya F.C. 1994–95, IPL)
Record win in Toto Cup: 8:0 (against F.C. Ashdod) 2010–11
Record European win: 5:1 (against Floriana F.C., 1996–97, in UEFA Cup Preliminary round)
Record defeat (and league defeat): 0:7 (against Maccabi Tel Aviv 2000–01, Israel Premier League)
Record European defeat: 0:6 (against S.L. Benfica, 1998–99, in UEFA Champions League 2nd qualifying round)
Longest game winning streak: 19 (during 1966–68 season in league A)
Longest game winning streak in the IPL: 9 (during 1996–97 season)
Most wins in a season (IPL): 22 wins in the 1992–93 season
Most points in a season (3 points per win, IPL): 71 points in the 1992–93 season
Most League goals scored in a season (IPL): 75 goals in the 1993–94, 2017–18 seasons. 161 goals in a double-season of 1966–68 in "league A", then the second league. 
Biggest point margin from the runners-up (winning the IPL championship): 15 points in the 1986–87 season
Biggest goal difference in a season (IPL): +42 in the 1996–97 season
Fewest goals conceded in a season (IPL): 14 in the 1977–78 season
Longest time period in the IPL without conceding a goal: 928 minutes in the 1974–75 season
Longest sequence of scoring in each league games (IPL): 43, since the last 6 games of 2017–18 on 22/4/2018 continuing as long as the whole 36 league games of 2017–18, and the 1st game of 2018–19, on 27/8/2018.

Individual records
Most League appearances: Uri Malmilian, 423 appearances
Most European appearances: Itzik Kornfein, 23 appearances
Oldest first-team player: Arnest Weinberger, 40 years, 363 days (against Maccabi Rehovot F.C., 30 March 1957)
Most appearances in Israeli national team: Uri Malmilian, 62 appearances
Most League goals: Eli Ohana, 142 goals
Most State cup goals: Uri Malmilian, 29 goals
Most European goals: István Sallói, 12 goals
Most goals scored for the national team (while being player for the team): Ronen Harazi, 18 goals
Highest goalscorer for one match: Simon Alfasi, 6 goals (against Degel-zion Tel Aviv, 29 November 1947)
Highest goalscorer in one season (30 games): Eli Miali 18 goals (in the 1978–79 season)
Longest time period without conceding a goal (GK):Yosef Surijnov, 928 minutes in the 1974–75 season

Former players

Most appearances

Most league goals

Player of the year

Players

Current squad

On loan

Foreigners 2022/23
Only up to six non-Israeli nationals can be in an Israeli club squad. Those married to an Israeli, or those with Jewish ancestry can claim a passport or permanent residency which would allow them to play with Israeli status.

  Danilo Asprilla
  Trazié Thomas
  Ion Nicolaescu
  Fred Friday
  Miguel Silva
  Sergei Borodin

Coaching staff

Managers

  Israel Halivner (1968–70)
  Arie Radler (1971–72)
  Emmanuel Scheffer (1979–80)
  Arie Radler (1980–81)
  Eliyahu Offer (1981–82)
  Dror Kashtan (1985–87)
  Eliyahu Offer (1988)
  Dror Kashtan (1988–89)
  Ze'ev Seltzer (1989–91)
  Michael Kadosh (1991–92)
  Dror Kashtan (1 July 1992 – 30 June 1994)
  Amatsia Levkovich (First 4 games of 1994–95)
  Yossi Mizrahi (1994–95)
  Eli Cohen I (1 July 1995 – 30 June 1997)
  Dror Kashtan (1 July 1997 – 30 June 1999)
  Eli Ohana (1 July 1999 – 30 June 2000)
  Eli Guttman (July 2000 – 1 March 2001)
  Yossi Mizrahi (June 2001 – July 2001)
  Eli Cohen I (1 July 2001 – 30 June 2003)
  Eli Ohana (1 July 2003 – 30 June 2005)
  Ton Caanen (5 June 2005 – 12 December 2005)
  Luis Fernández (13 December 2005 – 6 June 2006)
  Osvaldo Ardiles (1 July 2006 – 18 October 2006)
  Yossi Mizrahi (Oct 2006 – 7 June 2007)
  Itzhak Shum (1 July 2007 – 1 September 2008)
  Reuven Atar (2 September 2008 – 30 June 2009)
  Itzhak Shum (1 July 2009 – 20 February 2010)
  David Amsalem (April 2010 – 11 June 2010)
  Uri Malmilian (1 July 2010 – 17 January 2011)
  Ronny Levy (17 January 2011 – 10 June 2011)
  David Amsalem (10 June 2011 – 17 August 2011)
  Yuval Naim (17 August 2011 – 8 February 2012)
  Hanan Azulay (interim) (9 February 2012 – 13 February 2012)
  Eli Cohen I (13 February 2012 – 4 May 2013)
  Eli Cohen II (4 May 2013 – 3 December 2013)
  David Amsalem (interim) (3 December 2013 – 9 December 2013)
  Ronny Levy (9 December 2013 – 10 May 2014)
  Meni Koretski (10 May 2014 – 15 January 2015)
  Guy Levy (interim) (January 2015 – 15 June)
   Slobodan Drapić (7 June 2015 – 1 June 2016)  
  Ran Ben Shimon (8 June 2016 – 5 February 2017)
  Sharon Mimer (6 February 2017 – 16 August 2017)
  Gili Levanda (3 September 2017 – 28 September 2017)
  Benny Ben Zaken (28 September 2017 – 1 June 2018)
  Guy Luzon (27 May 2018 – 22 October 2018)
  Nir Klinger (29 October 2018 – 4 June 2019)
  Ronny Levy (6 June 2019 – 28 August 2020)
   Slobodan Drapić (4 September 2020 – 20 March 2021)  
  Erwin Koeman (3 June 2021 – 1 December 2021)
  Yossi Mizrahi (9 December 2021 – 26 January 2022)
  Yossi Abukasis (3 February 2022  - Present)

Notes

References

External links

  Official website
 UEFA Profile
 בית"ר.נט - אתר האוהדים של בית"ר י-ם (fans website)

 
Association football clubs established in 1936
Sport in Jerusalem
Jerusalem
Jerusalem
1936 establishments in Mandatory Palestine
Organizations based in Jerusalem
Donald Trump in popular culture
Anti-Arabism in Israel